Emirates is a rapid transit station on the Red Line of the Dubai Metro in Dubai, UAE. It is located very close to Dubai International Airport. The station is connected to the entrance of the Emirates Group headquarters.

History
The station was not one of the initial stations of the Dubai Metro, when the Red Line opened on 9 September 2009 with trains running to Nakheel Harbour and Tower with seven intermediate stations. However, it opened the year after on 30 April 2010.

Station layout
Emirates station has two side platforms and two tracks.

Platform layout

References

Railway stations in the United Arab Emirates opened in 2010
Dubai Metro stations